Gallery wrap is a method of stretching an artist's canvas so that the canvas wraps around the sides of the stretcher bar or strainer bars and is secured to the back of the wooden frame.

Structure
The frame is usually 1.25" (approx. 4 cm) thick. As a result, the hardware (staples or tacks) used to secure the canvas are not visible. The sides of the canvas are prepared and primed in the same manner as the face or front. They may then be painted a solid color (usually white) or painted to continue the image appearing on the face. This method of stretching and preparing a canvas allows for a frameless presentation of the finished painting or photograph. In some competitions it is considered "framed" and ready to hang.

Terminology
In canvas printing, the term "gallery wrap" refers to an image that appears on the sides of the frame as well as the front. The image on the sides is either a continuation or a reflection of the main image, or an otherwise fabricated element such as a solid color or colors derived from the adjacent image.

Gallery wrap is a very popular way to display art. However, because the edges of the canvas are wrapped over the thick bars, approximately two inches of the image (top, bottom, and sides) are not visible from the front. If the subject of an image or painting is sized and positioned correctly, the image will not be negatively affected. However, in some situations photo editing techniques are employed to fabricate additional image/material or to mirror existing content  on the wrapped edges. Solid colours can also be used on the wrapped edges.

Gallery wrap production can be digitally automated with a Photoshop plugin or raster graphics editor.

Gallery wrap versus non-gallery wrap
Gallery wrap is a method of displaying art wrapped over thick wooden bars so that there are no visible fasteners (such as staples or tacks). This method of stretching and preparing a canvas allows for a frame-less presentation of the finished painting.

In contrast, a non-gallery wrap canvas is usually intended to be framed before presentation. 
The stretcher bars are often thinner, and the canvas can be secured at the sides with staples or tacks as the frame will hide them. 
However, thin stretcher bars can be found "gallery wrapped" as a hangable work without a frame.

Quality 
A good gallery wrap consists of the following qualities:
 Tight Stretch: Good gallery wraps are stretched tightly over the stretcher bars to maintain a flat, unaltered image. On canvases that are not tightly stretched, waves or bumpy areas, especially on areas around the stretcher bars, can be seen and felt.
 Hand Stretched: Hand stretched canvases are the best option because this reduces the possibility of over-stretching. Machines may over stretch the image, causing rips or breaks in the ink of the image. Hand stretched canvases also allow for humans to align the image in a more visually appealing way, being sure not to cut off any parts of the main image which a machine would not be able to detect.
 Clean Staples: On the back of the canvas, good gallery wraps are stapled cleanly and securely.
 Clean Folds: Good gallery wraps have clean folds on the edges. You can see the nice folds on the corners that show they are hand stretched, but no extra pieces of canvas are sticking out or causing extra lumps under the image.
 Solid Wood Stretcher Bars: Good quality wraps should have a good foundations. Solid wood stretcher bars provide a good base for stretching and keep the canvas from bowing or bending over time.

See also
 Shaped canvas
 Stretcher bar

References

External links
 Explanation of different canvas wrap types

Visual arts materials
Picture framing